Hermann Hinterstocker (born 21 June 1956) is a German former ice hockey player. He competed in the men's tournament at the 1980 Winter Olympics.

References

External links
 

1956 births
Living people
German ice hockey players
Olympic ice hockey players of West Germany
Ice hockey players at the 1980 Winter Olympics
People from Miesbach (district)
Sportspeople from Upper Bavaria